The Federal University of Piauí (UFPI) is a federal university in Teresina, Piauí. It is the major university in the state of Piauí and one of the main research centers in Brazil's Northeast Region.

See also
Brazil University Rankings
Universities and Higher Education in Brazil

References

External links

 
Brazilian Ministry of Education and Culture

Universities and colleges in Piauí
Piauí
Buildings and structures in Piauí
1971 establishments in Brazil
Educational institutions established in 1971